Michael J. Preston  is a professor emeritus of English at the University of Colorado Boulder, specializing in Middle English and early Renaissance literature, vernacular culture, folklore and traditional drama.

In 1976 a subspecies of Mexican lizard, Sceloporus torquatus mikeprestoni, was named in his honor by Hobart M. Smith and José Ticul Álvarez.

References

Year of birth missing (living people)
Living people
University of Colorado Boulder faculty